Sphingobium francense is a hexachlorocyclohexane-degrading bacteria with type strain MTCC 6363T (=CCM 7288T).

References

Further reading

External links

LPSN
Type strain of Sphingobium francense at BacDive -  the Bacterial Diversity Metadatabase

Sphingomonadales